Jack Welborn (December 20, 1932 – March 7, 2021) was an American politician who served in the Michigan House of Representatives from 1973 to 1974 and in the Michigan Senate from 1975 to 1982 and from 1985 to 1994.

He died of kidney failure on March 7, 2021, in Kalamazoo, Michigan, at age 88.

References

1932 births
2021 deaths
Republican Party members of the Michigan House of Representatives
Republican Party Michigan state senators
People from Kalamazoo, Michigan
20th-century American politicians